Tisias caesena is a butterfly in the family Hesperiidae. It is found in Brazil.

References

Butterflies described in 1867
Hesperiinae
Hesperiidae of South America
Taxa named by William Chapman Hewitson